Romeo Muradyan (born 1979) is an Armenian actor best known for playing Edgar on the Armenian TV Series Don't Be Afraid and as Ludovic on the theater play God Bless You. In 2020, he played the role of Rustam in the Armenian TV series Anatolian Story.

Biography 
Muradyan was born in Tbilisi, Georgia to Armenian parents. He has a sister. He began his career in 1995, aged 16, when he appeared in the theater play Scandal in Avlabar. In 1998 he graduated from drama school at the Tbilisi State Armenian Drama Theater. From 1998 to 2012 worked as an actor Tbilisi State Armenian Drama Theatre. He worked in the theater of Fame Stepanian. In 2012, he moved to Paris, France where his sister lived since 2009. He is fluent Armenian, Georgian, Russian and a little French.

Personal life 
On September 23, 2000, Romeo marry with Alina Muradyan (née Tumasyan). They have two boys: Hamlet (b. October 31, 2003), Giorgi (b. September 18, 2009) and a girl Rosalie (b. January 15, 2016). His eldest son was in the Armenian film The Open Door (Դուռը Բաց) in 2011.

Filmography

Movie and television 
 2006 : Don't Be Afraid (Մի Վախեցիր) : Edgar  
 2006 : The Bullet Paper (ქაღალდის ტყვია) : Seroj 
 2009 : Independence (დამუკიდებლობის) : Communist of Armenia
 2020 : Anatolian Story (Անատոլիական պատմություն) : Rustam (recurring role, 5 episodes)

Theater 
 1995 : Scandal in Avlabar : Sako
 1996 : Grooms my daughter: Aram / Armen 
 1997 : The Passion of Artashes : Warrior 
 1998 : The Love Mount: Vagan
 1999-2000 : Initially, died, then got married: Sergo 
 Unknown year : Carnival : Goat
 Unknown year : Picnic : Sapo 
 Unknown year : Uncle Baghdasar : Oksen 
 Unknown year : Eastern Dentist : Markar  
 Unknown year : The Indictment : Gigla Meburashvili
 Unknown year : Christmas in The House Kupello : Ninilo 
 2005 : God Bless You !: Ludovic (in Tbilissi) 
 2014 : God Bless You !: Ludovic (in Paris)

References

External links
 Romeo Muradyan at the Hayazg
 

1979 births
20th-century male actors from Georgia (country)
20th-century Armenian male actors
Male stage actors from Georgia (country)
Living people
Actors from Tbilisi
Georgian people of Armenian descent
21st-century male actors from Georgia (country)
Male film actors from Georgia (country)
21st-century Armenian male actors
Armenian male film actors
Armenian male stage actors